Drimmelen is a municipality and a town in the southern Netherlands, in the province North Brabant.

A large portion of the Biesbosch National Park is part of this municipality.

Population centres 
Towns:
Made (population: 11,710)
 Terheijden (6,410)
 Lage Zwaluwe (4,060)
 Wagenberg (2,250)
 Hooge Zwaluwe (1,670)
 Drimmelen (570)

Hamlets (population data concerning these hamlets are included in the population data of the towns near which they are located):
 Blauwe Sluis
 Oud-Drimmelen
 Helkant

Topography

Dutch Topographic map of the municipality of Drimmelen, June 2015.

Transportation
The Lage Zwaluwe railway station is situated on the Breda–Rotterdam railway and the railway to Roosendaal.

Notable people 

 Godfried Schalcken (1643 in Made – 1706) a Dutch genre and portrait painter
 Pieter Rudolph Kleijn (1785 in Hooge Zwaluwe – 1816) a 19th-century landscape painter
 Petrus van Schendel (1806 in Terheijden - 1870) a Dutch-Belgian Romantic style genre painter 
 Johannes Gijsbert Vogel (1828 in Hooge Zwaluwe – 1915) a Dutch landscape painter 
 Antal van den Bosch (born 1969 in Made) a Dutch-language researcher and former academic

Sport 
 Kees Pellenaars (1913 in Terheijden – 1988) a Dutch road cyclist and coach
 Antoon van Schendel (1918 in Lage Zwaluwe — 1990) a Dutch professional road bicycle racer. 
 Wim Hofkens (born 1958 in Made) a former football player with 474 club caps
 Gianni Romme (born 1973 in Lage Zwaluwe) a Dutch marathon runner and a former long track speed skater, won two gold medals at the 1998 Winter Olympics
 Hans Horrevoets (born 1974 in Made – 2006) a Dutch sea sailor
 Tim Lips (born 1985 in Made) a Dutch eventer, competed at the 2008 and the 2012 Summer Olympics
 Pieter Braun (born 1993 in Terheijden) is a Dutch decathlon athlete, competed at the 2016 Summer Olympics

Gallery

References

External links

Official Website

 
Municipalities of North Brabant
Populated places in North Brabant
Municipalities of the Netherlands established in 1998